There have been two Battles of Isaszeg in history of Hungary:
 Battle of Isaszeg (1265)
 Battle of Isaszeg (1849)

Battles involving Hungary